Nancy Youngblut (born February 14, 1953) is an American actress. She has appeared on stage and television. On Broadway in Burn This and on episodic television including Bones, Cold Case, The Unit, E.R., CSI: Crime Scene Investigation, Star Trek: Deep Space Nine, Diagnosis: Murder, Star Trek: Voyager, Dr. Quinn, Medicine Woman and Murphy Brown.  She graduated from The College of St. Catherine in St. Paul, Minnesota and the University of Georgia with an MFA in Directing for the Theatre.

External links
 
 
 

1953 births
American film actresses
American stage actresses
American television actresses
Living people
People from Waterloo, Iowa
University of Georgia alumni
St. Catherine University alumni
20th-century American actresses
21st-century American actresses
21st-century American women